The following are the national records in Olympic weightlifting in Mexico. Records are maintained in each weight class for the snatch lift, clean and jerk lift, and the total for both lifts by the Federación Mexicana de Levantamiento de Pesas (FMLP).

Men

Women

Historical records

Men (1998–2018)

Women (1998–2018)

References

External links

records
Mexico
Olympic weightlifting
weightlifting